The Ashes is a 1965 Polish drama film directed by Andrzej Wajda, referencing the classic Stefan Żeromski epic novel of Polish Literature of the same name. It was entered into the 1966 Cannes Film Festival. It sold about  tickets in Poland, becoming one of the highest-grossing Polish films of all time.

Cast
 Daniel Olbrychski - Rafał Olbromski
 Bogusław Kierc - Krzysztof Cedro
 Piotr Wysocki - Jan Gintułt
 Beata Tyszkiewicz - Princess Elżbieta
 Pola Raksa - Helena de With
 Władysław Hańcza - Rafal's Father
 Jan Świderski - General Sokolnicki
 Jan Koecher - General de With
 Zbigniew Sawan - Krzysztof's Father
 Józef Duriasz - Piotr Olbromski
 Zbigniew Józefowicz - Michcik
 Janusz Zakrzeński - Napoleon Bonaparte
 Józef Nalberczak - Soldier Wanderer
 Stanisław Zaczyk - Józef Poniatowski
 Zofia Saretok - Helena's Aunt
 Krzysztof Litwin - Officer
 Arkadiusz Bazak - Officer
 Tomasz Zaliwski - Officer
 Stanisław Mikulski - Polish Soldier

References

External links

1965 films
1965 drama films
Polish drama films
Polish black-and-white films
1960s Polish-language films
Films based on works by Stefan Żeromski
Films directed by Andrzej Wajda
Films shot in Bulgaria